John Donatich is the Director of Yale University Press.

Early life
He received a BA from New York University in 1982, graduating magna cum laude. He also got a master's degree from NYU in 1984, graduating summa cum laude.

Career
Donatich worked as director of National Accounts at Putnam Publishing Group from 1989 to 1992.

His writing has appeared in various periodicals including Harper's, The Atlantic Monthly and The Village Voice.

He worked at HarperCollins from 1992 to 1996, serving as director of national accounts and then as vice president and director of product and marketing development.

From 1995 to 2003, Donatich served as publisher and vice president of Basic Books. While there, he started the Art of Mentoring series of books, which would run from 2001 to 2008.  While at Basic Books, Donatich published such authors as Christopher Hitchens, Steven Pinker, Samantha Power, Alan Dershowitz, Sir Martin Rees and Richard Florida.

In 2003, Donatich became the director of the Yale University Press.  At Yale, Donatich published such authors as Michael Walzer, Janet Malcolm, E. H. Gombrich, Michael Fried, Edmund Morgan and T. J.  Clark.  Donatich began the Margellos World Republic of Letters, a literature in translation series that published such authors as Adonis, Norman Manea and Claudio Magris. He also launched the digital archive platform, The Stalin Digital Archive and the Encounters Chinese Language multimedia platform.

In 2009, he briefly gained media attention when he was involved in the decision to expunge the Muhammad cartoons from the Yale University Press book The Cartoons that Shook the World, for fear of Muslim violence.

He is the author of a memoir, Ambivalence, a Love Story, and a novel, The Variations.

Books
 Ambivalence, a Love Story: Portrait of a Marriage (memoir), St. Martin's Press, 2005.
 The Variations (novel), Henry Holt, March, 2012

Articles
 Why Books Still Matter, Journal of Scholarly Publishing, Volume 40, Number 4, July 2009, pp. 329–342, E- Print

Personal life
Donatich is married to Betsy Lerner, a literary agent and author; together they have a daughter, Raffaella.

References

Year of birth missing (living people)
Living people
New York University alumni
Yale University staff